The Prussian carp, silver Prussian carp or  Gibel carp (Carassius gibelio), is a member of the family Cyprinidae, which includes many other fish, such as the common carp, goldfish, and the smaller minnows. They are usually silver, although other color variations exist. They are omnivorous and feed on plankton, invertebrates, plant material and detritus. Originally from Siberia or central Europe, they have been introduced to and are now inhabiting lakes, ponds, and slow-moving rivers throughout Europe, North America, and Asia.

Prussian carps are highly invasive fish species in areas outside its native range. They reproduce and spread rapidly. In 2020, scientists demonstrated that a small proportion of fertilized Prussian carp eggs ingested by waterfowl survive passing through the digestive tract and hatch after being retrieved from the feces.  Birds exhibit strong preference for fish eggs, while cyprinids produce hundreds of thousands of eggs at a single spawning event. These data indicate that despite the low proportion of eggs surviving the digestive tract of birds, endozoochory might provide a potentially overlooked dispersal mechanism of Prussian carps. If proven under natural circumstances, endozoochorous dispersal of invasive fish could be a strong conservation concern for freshwater biodiversity.

Prussian carp are capable of gynogenesis, meaning sperm is required to fertilize their eggs, but the male gamete does not contribute any DNA to the embryo. Females lay eggs and then "steal" sperm from related species. In other words, they are able to reproduce from unfertilized egg.

Description

Its scales are larger than those of the crucian carp, and it typically has 27 to 32 scales along the lateral line, whereas the crucian carp usually has between 31 and 35. The species is silvery, sometimes with a faint golden tinge, while the crucian carp has a burnished gold appearance. The Prussian carp's tail is more deeply forked than that of the crucian carp.

References

External link

Prussian carp
Prussian carp
Freshwater fish of Europe
Freshwater fish of Asia
Prussian carp